The Punta del Castillete Lighthouse is an active lighthouse on the Canary island of Gran Canaria. It is located on cliffs above the resort and fishing harbour of Puerto de Mogán, in the municipality of Mogán. Punta Castillete is on the south-western side of the island facing the Atlantic Ocean, and lies between Maspalomas Lighthouse to the south and the lighthouse of Punta Sardina to the north.

History 
The lighthouse was constructed between 1985 and 1995, and first entered service in March 1996. The modern design, which has been called "ungainly", consists of a square base faced with dark volcanic rock, supporting a concrete tower with external stairways leading to a cantilevered gallery. Originally painted a sandy yellow colour, it was repainted in blue and white in 2014.

The lighthouse is not connected to the electricity grid, but instead is powered by six solar panels charging a set of batteries. The 500 mm lantern is equipped with a 150 watt halogen lamp, producing a white light. With a focal height of 114 m above sea level, its light can be seen for 17 nautical miles.

The area around the lighthouse is accessible following a steep climb via a road with many hairpin turns from the resort of Puerto de Mogán, although the tower itself is closed.

Puerto de Mogán 
The nearby harbour in Puerto de Mogán has two smaller aids to navigation, which mark the entrance to the port and marina. On the main breakwater is a light mounted on a tower above the centre of the El Faro restaurant. Painted white with red bands, the lantern on the 6 m tower emits a flashing red light.

On the opposite side of the entrance, next to the hotel is a beacon 2 m high, that shows a flashing green light.

See also 

 List of lighthouses in Spain
 List of lighthouses in the Canary Islands

References

External links 
 Comisión de faros
 Autoridad Portuaria de Las Palmas de Gran Canaria

Lighthouses in Gran Canaria
Lighthouses completed in 1996